Corbi is a commune in Argeș County, Muntenia, Romania.

It is composed of six villages: Corbi, Corbșori, Jgheaburi, Poduri, Poenărei and Stănești. Corbi is located in the northern part of Argeș County: its neighbours are Nucșoara commune to the north, Domnești commune to the south, Aninoasa commune to the east and Brăduleț and Mușătești communes to the west.

The agricultural surface of the entire locality is 5,664 hectares, of which 198 ha is arable land, 2,829 ha pastures, 1,809 ha hay fields, 828 ha meadows and 200 ha forests.

The population of the commune is 4,438 people, and the surface is 40 km2.

The main occupations are sheep-keeping (20,000 sheep), cattle-keeping (1,700 heads of cattle) and animal husbandry.

The commune's villages have six schools, six Romanian Orthodox churches, five kindergartens, three community centres, a medical unit, a veterinary office, a pharmacy, a post office, a bakery and other businesses.

Natives
 :ro:Teofan Savu, Metropolitan of Moldova and Bukovina.

References

Ion I Ilinescu. "Corbi-Argeș - tradiție și contemporaneitate", Tiparg Typography, Argeș, 2004, 

Communes in Argeș County
Localities in Muntenia